Downtown Winter Park Historic District is a national historic district in Winter Park, Florida, Orange County. Including buildings constructed from 1882 through 1965, runs along Park Avenue from Canton to Comstock avenues.

It was added to the National Register of Historic Places in 2011.

References

National Register of Historic Places in Orange County, Florida
Historic districts on the National Register of Historic Places in Florida
Winter Park, Florida
2011 establishments in Florida